K74 may refer to:

 , a Flower-class corvette in the Royal Navy during the Second World War
 USN airship K-74, lost to German submarine U-134 (1941) in 1943
 K-74 (Kansas highway), a state highway in Kansas